Lyndsay Meyer (born December 26, 1973) is an American ski mountaineer.

Maeyer was born in Minnetonka, Minnesota, and attended the Blake School, before she studied at Colgate University. She lives in Aspen, Colorado.

Selected results 
 2009:
 8th, Pierra Menta, together with Nina Cook Silitch
 10th, Trofeo Mezzalama, together with Chantal Daucourt and Cécile Pasche
 2010:
 3rd, Zermatt-Rothorn run
 7th, Patrouille des Glaciers, together with Nina Cook Silitch and Monique Merrill
 9th, Pierra Menta, together with Nina Cook Silitch
 2011:
 5th USA National Championships in Jackson Hole
 2nd, Power of Four, Aspen Mountain, women's team, together with Jessica Phillips
 6th, Trofeo Mezzalama, together with Nina Cook Silitch and Valentine Fabre
 2012:
 2nd Power of Four with Sari Anderson
 4th, North American Championship, sprint
 8th, North American Championship, individual
 8th, North American Championship, total ranking
 2013
 2nd Power of Four with Jari Kirkland
 1st America's Uphill
 3rd Matterhorn Ultraks with Melanie Bernier and Janelle Smiley
 1st Mezzalama mixed coed team with Stevie Kremer and Marshall Thompson

External links 
 Lyndsay Meyer, skimountaineers.org

References 

1973 births
Living people
American female ski mountaineers
People from Minnetonka, Minnesota
Sportspeople from Minnesota
Colgate University alumni
21st-century American women